Lyman Bradford Smith (September 11, 1904 – May 4, 1997) was an American botanist.

Smith was born in Winchester, Massachusetts. He studied botany during the 1920s at Harvard University and received his PhD from Harvard in 1930. Between 1928 and 1929, he worked for the first time in Brazil. Most of his life's work came to involve the taxonomy of the flowering plants of South America, in particular the bromeliads (Bromeliaceae). Smith worked on the Bromeliaceae for the North American Flora published by the American botanist Nathaniel Lord Britton, volume 19, no. 2 (1938).  Smith was a world authority on Begoniaceae and also worked with Velloziaceae and numerous other plant families. He was a curator in the Smithsonian Institution's Department of Botany from 1947 until his retirement in 1974, but continued to work in the United States National Herbarium as an emeritus curator almost until his death in Manhattan, Kansas, in 1997.

Works
This list may be incomplete.
 The Bromeliaceae of Brazil, 1955
 The Bromeliaceae of Colombia, 1957
 Begoniaceae, 1986

References 

Biography: 
 Taxon, Vol. 46(4) (1997): 819–824.
 Robert Zander, Fritz Encke, Günther Buchheim, Siegmund Seybold (editor): Handwörterbuch der Pflanzennamen. 13th ed. Ulmer Verlag, Stuttgart 1984, .

External links
List of plants described by Lyman Bradford Smith (IPNI)
Lyman Bradford Smith Papers from the Smithsonian Institution Archives

1904 births
1997 deaths
Botanists with author abbreviations
Botanists active in South America
Harvard University alumni
Smithsonian Institution people
People from Winchester, Massachusetts
20th-century American botanists